The 86th Signal Battalion ("Tigers") of the United States Army is an element of 11th Signal Brigade. It is based at Fort Bliss, Texas. The unit mascot is the Tiger.

Mission
The 86th Expeditionary Signal Battalion enables mission command for supported units, without Signal assets.  The Battalion engineers, installs, operates, maintains, and defends network communications in support of Combatant Commanders and Joint Force Land Component Commanders. The Battalion currently provides support to the Brigade Modernization Command and 1st Armored Division during the Network Integration Evaluation (NIE) held bi-annually in the Spring and Fall at Fort Bliss, TX and  White Sands Missile Range, NM.

History
The 86th Signal Battalion was first constituted on 23 March 1966 in the Regular Army as Headquarters and Headquarters Detachment, 86th Signal Battalion.  The Battalion was officially activated on 1 June 1966 at  Fort Bragg, NC.  The battalion deployed to Vietnam from 1967 through 1971.  On 30 April 1971 the Battalion was officially deactivated in Vietnam.

The Battalion was re-activated on 1 July 1977 at  Fort Huachuca, AZ as Headquarters and Headquarters Company, 86th Signal Battalion.

In April 2011 the Battalion returned from a deployment from Afghanistan.  Shortly after the deployment the Battalion completed a BRAC move to  Fort Bliss, TX.

Subordinate units
The 86th Signal Battalion is an Expeditionary Signal Battalion or "ESB". It comprises the following units:
Headquarters and Headquarters Company (HHC)
A Company (Expeditionary Signal Company)
B Company (Expeditionary Signal Company)
C Company (Area Signal Company)

Capabilities
In the Spring of 2014 the Battalion was fielded with Warfighter Information Network - Tactical Increment 1b (WIN-T Inc 1b).  The Battalion was the first ESB to be fielded with WIN-T Inc 1b.  WIN-T Inc 1b, introduced the Network Centric Waveform into the tactical network which optimizes bandwidth and removed the military's reliance on costly civilian satellite services.  It also introduced the colorless network.  The colorless network enables the encryption of unclassified data when transmitted it over satellite and line of sight.

Honors

Unit decorations

Campaign streamers

References

External links
86th ESB Lineage and Honors

Military units and formations in Texas